In organic chemistry, thia-crown ethers are organosulfur compounds which are the thia analogues of crown ethers (cyclic polyethers). That is, they have a sulfur atom (sulfide linkage) in place of each oxygen atom (ether linkage) around the ring. While the parent crown ethers have the formulae , the parent thia-crown ethers have the formulae , where n = 3, 4, 5, 6. They have trivial names "x-ane-Sy", where x and y are the number of atoms in the ring and the number of those atoms that are sulfur, respectively. Thia-crown ethers exhibit affinities for transition metals.

1,4,7-Trithiacyclononane (9-ane-S3) is a tridentate ligand and forms complexes with many metal ions, including those considered hard, such as copper(II) and iron(II).

Tetradentate 14-ane-S4 and the hexadentate 18-ane-S6 are also known.

References 

Sulfur heterocycles
Thioethers
Chelating agents
Macrocycles